Showbiz is a vernacular term for show business.

Showbiz may also refer to:

Music
 Showbiz (Muse album), 1999, or the title track
 Showbiz (Cud album), 1994
 Showbiz and A.G., an American hip hop duo
 Grant Showbiz, a British record producer and live sound recordist
 "Showbiz (The Battle)", a 2004 single by M. Pokora
 "Showbiz", a song by Helen Reddy from the 1974 album Free and Easy

Other uses
 ArcSoft ShowBiz, a video editor for the Windows operating system
 Showbiz (film), a Hindi film directed by Raju Khan
 Showbiz name or stage name, a pseudonym used by performers and entertainers
 ShowBiz Pizza Place, an American restaurant chain popular in the 1980s

See also
 Show business (disambiguation)